Oakland Cemetery may refer to:

 Oakland Cemetery (Camden, Arkansas), listed on the National Register of Historic Places
 Oakland Cemetery, Confederate Section, Camden, Arkansas, listed on the NRHP
 Oakland Cemetery (Little Rock, Arkansas), listed on the NRHP in Arkansas
 Oakland Cemetery (Atlanta), Georgia, listed on the NRHP
 Oakland Cemetery (Princeton, Illinois), listed on the NRHP
 Oakland Cemetery (Fort Dodge, Iowa), listed on the NRHP
 Oakland Cemetery (Iowa City, Iowa)
 Oakland Cemetery (Shreveport, Louisiana), listed on the NRHP in Louisiana
 Oakland Cemetery (Yonkers, New York)
 Oakland Cemetery Chapel and Superintendent's House and Office, Sandusky, Ohio, listed on the NRHP in Ohio
 Oakland Cemetery (Shelby, Ohio), cemetery in Shelby, Ohio
 Oakland Cemetery (Dallas, Texas), cemetery in Dallas, Texas
 Oakland Cemetery (Trenton, Tennessee), listed on the NRHP in Tennessee
 Oakland Cemetery (Saint Paul, Minnesota), cemetery in Saint Paul, Minnesota

See also
Oakwood Cemetery (disambiguation)